Ivar Petterson Tveiten (18 December 1850 – 17  April 1934) was a Norwegian teacher and elected official of the Liberal Party who  served as
President of the Norwegian Parliament from 1916 to 1921. He also served as Minister of Education and Church Affairs from 1924 to 1926.

Biography
Tveiten was born in the parish of Fyresdal in Telemark, Norway. He was the son of Petter Veum (1811–89) and Tone Lislestog (1827–53).  He graduated  from the Kviteseid School (Kviteseid Seminar) in 1868. He served as a teacher from 1868 to 1883. In 1875, he acquired the farm Tveiten Vestre in Liegrend (Tveiten vestre Gnr. 88/2).

He was elected to Parliament as a representative of Bratsberg amt (now Telemark) from 1903 to 1924. He was Vice President 1916, President 1917-1920 and Chairman of the Presidency in 1920.

Tveiten was made a member of the Order of St. Olav Order in 1914. He died during 1934 and was buried in the cemetery at Veum Church in  Fyresdal.

References

1850 births
1932 deaths
People from Fyresdal
Norwegian educators
Members of the Storting
Presidents of the Storting
Vice Presidents of the Storting
Government ministers of Norway
Recipients of the St. Olav's Medal
Ministers of Education of Norway